Crime and Punishment is a two-part British television crime drama series, based upon the 1866 novel of the same name by Fyodor Dostoyevsky, that first broadcast on BBC2 on 12 February 2002. The novel was adapted for television by playwright Tony Marchant, and was directed by Julian Jarrold.

John Simm stars as Rodya Raskolnikov, a former student who plans the murder of a pawnbroker to alleviate his financial problems, but also as an existential exercise, feeling himself able to commit such acts without guilt, remorse or justification. The series was broadcast over two consecutive nights, airing in the 9:00-10:30pm slot. The series was released on DVD on 25 August 2008, via 2|Entertain.

Production
The series was filmed in St. Petersburg. Simm said of his role as Raskolnikov; "The hard job for me is to make the viewer understand why Raskolnikov kills. But that is helped by seeing the place that he has to live in, it was absolutely disgusting. He is a very intelligent guy, who is slowly driven to madness by the things he sees around him."

Reception
The series gathered mixed reviews in the press, with The Guardian claiming that "As Raskolnikov, the murderer, John Simm is the spindle the whole thing whirls around. He gives a vivid performance and looks like a vicious angel. In the current Augean state of the stables, I am not able to find fault with this well-bred winner"; while The Telegraph were more scathing, writing "It's as if scriptwriter Tony Marchant and director Julian Jarrold had decided to take the setting and crime-drama structure of Crime and Punishment and ditch the philosophical core, the engine that gives everything meaning."

Cast
 John Simm as Rodya Raskolnikov
 Ian McDiarmid as Detective Porfiry
 Shaun Dingwall as Razumikhin 
 Geraldine James as Pulcheria
 Kate Ashfield as Dounia 
 Lara Belmont as Sonya
 Mark Benton as Zosimov 
 Katrin Cartlidge as Katerina
 Alice Connor as Polya
 David Haig as Luzhin
 Martin Hancock as Koch
 Anna Hope as Nastasya
 Philip Jackson as Marmeladov
 Sean McKenzie as Semyonobvich
 Roger Morlidge as Lt. Gunpowder
 Jake Nightingale as Artisan
 Tim Potter as Nikolai
 Nigel Terry as Svidrigailov
 Darren Tighe as Zamyotov
 Heather Tobias as Lizaveta

Episodes

References

External links

2002 British television series debuts
2002 British television series endings
2000s British drama television series
British crime television series
English-language television shows
Films based on Crime and Punishment
2002 television films
2002 films
Films directed by Julian Jarrold
British television films